Doyalson is a village of the Central Coast region of New South Wales, Australia. It is part of the  local government area.

Munmorah State Coal Mine operated in this vicinity 1962–2005.

References

Suburbs of the Central Coast (New South Wales)